−77.82X−78.29 is the second extended play and fourth release by South Korean girl group Everglow. It was released on September 21, 2020, by Yuehua Entertainment. It is available in two versions, -77.82X and -78.29, and contains four tracks, with "La Di Da" released as the lead single.

Name 
The album is titled -77.82X-78.29 after the coordinates of Antarctica, which is featured on the album cover.

Background
On September 7, 2020, Yuehua Entertainment revealed that Everglow would release their second mini-album titled −77.82X−78.29 on September 21.

Concept images came out between September 8–10. The tracklist was released on September 11, revealing four tracks: lead single "La Di Da", "Untouchable", "Gxxd Boy" and "No Good Reason"; the lyrics for "La Di Da" were co-written by member E:U.

The music video teaser for "La Di Da" was released on September 16, and the music video on September 21.

Composition 
According to Yuehua Entertainment, -77.82X-78.29 represents Everglow's "powerful and intense charisma", as compared to their previous works. The album is characterized by its bolder sound.

The lead single, "La Di Da", falls in the uptempo electropop and retro categories, and its lyrical content is a "warning" to the "haters who are pretending and full of dissatisfaction in [this] confusing era".

Promotion
Everglow held a live showcase on September 21, where they performed "La Di Da" and "Untouchable".

The group started promoting "La Di Da" on September 24 at Mnet's M Countdown, followed by performances on KBS' Music Bank, MBC's Show! Music Core and SBS' Inkigayo.

They broke their first week's sales, with their album selling more than 25,000 copies.

Track listing

Charts

Accolades

Release history

References

2020 EPs
Everglow albums
Korean-language EPs
Yuehua Entertainment EPs
Stone Music Entertainment EPs